Wheaton Lake is a lake located on Vancouver Island  west of Marble Peak on the south side of Buttle Lake in Strathcona Provincial Park.

See also
List of lakes of British Columbia

References

Alberni Valley
Lakes of Vancouver Island
Nootka Land District